Bramalea GO Station is a GO Transit railway and bus station along the Kitchener line in Brampton, Ontario, Canada. It is located at 1713 Steeles Avenue East, near the community of Bramalea at Steeles Ave. East and Bramalea Road.

Like many other stations on the GO Train network, Bramalea is equipped with parking facilities, elevators for wheelchair access, a station building housing a waiting room and ticket sales, a Ticket Vending Machine, and a bus loop.

In addition to the train service during the weekdays, it also features some train-bus services to/from Union Station and a frequent Highway 407 bus serving Highway 407 Bus Terminal, Square One, Sheridan College (Trafalgar Campus) Oakville, McMaster University, and Hamilton.

Bramalea was previously the western terminus of all-day weekday train service to/from Union Station on the Georgetown line. Midday service was suspended to facilitate construction on the line.

Since midday train service on the Georgetown corridor was first launched in May 2002, GO Transit has hired various contractors to improve the station.  First, the station was made wheelchair-accessible by building an additional pedestrian tunnel and a pair of elevators, completed in January 2003. In August of that year, construction began of a new rail platform which was required in order to provide for all-day train service for the station, as the station is located on a busy railway corridor used by Canadian National Railways freight trains bypassing Toronto.

Improvements 

To accommodate future increases in ridership, a new 650-space parking lot was opened in June 2005 on the south side of the tracks. GO Transit had also constructed a bus garage at the north-east corner by Steeles Avenue and Bramalea Road. The garage was subsequently removed and replaced with much-needed additional parking spaces in November 2011. A platform extension to allow 12-car trains was completed in early 2017.

To support GO expansion plans for more frequent, reliable service on the Kitchener line, major improvements are planned for completion in 2021 including:

  A new station building linked to a parking garage, adding close to 1,300 parking spaces
  A new passenger pick-up and drop-off area (called Kiss & Ride)
  Improved bus platforms for GO Transit and Brampton Transit, with a dedicated Züm bus loop
  Covered bike parking
  New retail spaces
  Improved access to Bramalea Road
  New accessible pedestrian tunnel at the west end of the station 
  Enhanced safety features including new emergency call systems and upgraded lighting
  Platform improvements with a snow-melt system that will clear the platform of snow and ice, and canopies. The platforms will also be expanded to accommodate 12-car trains.

On September 13, 2021, a new parking garage opened as part of a rehabilitation project at the station. The multi-level garage can hold 2,059 vehicles and features a colour-coded wayfinding system, two elevators, a car counting system and over 100 security cameras. The car counting system will identify which levels have available parking spots distinguishing accessibility from regular spots. Also opening is a new accessible tunnel to access train platforms directly from the station building. The station building has been redesigned with larger windows.

Bus service
Bus bay assignments
 5 – Drop Off area
 6 – GO Transit Route: 36-B Eastbound
 6 – GO Transit Route: 31N Westbound
 7 – GO Transit Route: 31-E,H,L Eastbound
 7 – GO Transit Route: 31-E,H Westbound
 8 – GO Transit Routes: 46, 47-A,F Westbound
 9 – GO Transit Routes: 25F, 46, 47-D,F, 48-B.F Eastbound
 10 – GO Transit Route: 32-A,B Eastbound
 10 – GO Transit Route: 32-B Westbound
 11 – GO Transit Routes: 30, 36-B Westbound
 12 – Brampton Transit Route: 15 Bramalea Southbound
 13 – Brampton Transit Routes: 40 Central Industrial, 92 Bramalea GO Shuttle
 14 – Brampton Transit Routes: 13 Avondale, 16 Southgate
 15 – Brampton Transit Route: 15/15A Bramalea Northbound
 16 – GO Transit Routes: 25F, 48-B,F Westbound

References

External links

GO Transit railway stations
Railway stations in Brampton
Year of establishment missing